Olof Erland (16 February 1944 - 23 May 2013) was a politician in the autonomous Åland Islands.
Deputy premier (vice lantråd) minister for finance 2001–2003.
Member of the lagting (Åland parliament) 1991–2011.

Married to Viveka Eriksson

References

1944 births
Living people
Politicians from Åland